An all-points bulletin is a law enforcement information dissemination tool.  

All Points Bulletin may also refer to:

All Points Bulletin (album), an album by Dispatch
APB (1987 video game), arcade game by Atari Games
APB: All Points Bulletin, a previously discontinued 2010 massive multiplayer online game for Microsoft Windows
APB (2017 TV series)

See also
APB (disambiguation)